Frederick Elder Birbeck Ivimey (28 March 1880 – 6 December 1961) was a New Zealand rugby union player. He travelled with the New Zealand national side, the All Blacks, on their 1910 tour of Australia, but played just one match, against Queensland, because of injury. He did not appear in any Test matches.

A son of Robert Lincoln Ivimey (1848–1927), Ivimey was a great-grandson of John Ivimey (1790–1874), a younger brother of Joseph Ivimey (1773–1834), Baptist minister and historian. He was also a cousin of the organist and composer John Ivimey. Born in Prittlewell, Essex, England, on 28 March 1880, Ivimey emigrated to New Zealand as a child. He served with New Zealand forces during the Second Boer War and later served as a regular soldier from 1904 until 1931. During World War II Ivimey served as a records and recruitment officer in Christchurch from 1939, before being transferred to the retired list with the rank of captain in August 1944. He died in Christchurch on 6 December 1961.

References

1880 births
1961 deaths
Sportspeople from Southend-on-Sea
English emigrants to New Zealand
New Zealand military personnel of the Second Boer War
New Zealand military personnel of World War I
New Zealand military personnel of World War II
New Zealand Army officers
New Zealand rugby union players
New Zealand international rugby union players
Otago rugby union players
Southland rugby union players
Rugby union flankers
Rugby union players from Essex
Military personnel from Southend-on-Sea